Spillersboda is a locality situated in Norrtälje Municipality, Stockholm County, Sweden with 314 inhabitants in 2005.

People born or living in Spillersboda 
 Alexandra Larsson (Swedish model based in Argentina)

References 

Populated places in Norrtälje Municipality